The twenty-fourth and final cycle of America's Next Top Model premiered on January 9, 2018 and was the second season to air on VH1. Continuing from cycle 23, this cycle featured an all-female cast. However, in a first for the series, the maximum age limit was removed, allowing contestants of all ages (lowest age limit still being 18) to enter the contest. Although this cycle aired in 2018, it was filmed from May through June 2017.

Top Model franchise creator Tyra Banks returned as the show's host after being replaced for one cycle by singer Rita Ora. The judging panel, consisting of model Ashley Graham, Paper magazine chief creative officer Drew Elliott, and celebrity stylist Law Roach, remained otherwise unchanged.

The winner of the competition was 20 year-old Kyla Coleman from Lacey, Washington with Jeana Turner placing as the runner-up.

Contestants
(Ages stated are at start of contest)

Episodes

Summaries

Call-out order

 The contestant was eliminated
 The contestant quit the competition
 The contestant was part of a non-elimination bottom two
 The contestant was originally eliminated but was saved
 The contestant was eliminated outside of judging panel
 The contestant won the competition

Average call-out order
Casting call-out order, comeback first call-out and final episode are not included.

Bottom two

 The contestant was eliminated after their first time in the bottom two
 The contestant was eliminated after their second time in the bottom two
 The contestant was originally eliminated but was saved.
 The contestant was eliminated in the final judging and placed third
 The contestant was eliminated in the final judging and placed second.
 The contestant was saved from elimination.
 The contestant quit the competition.

Photo shoot guide
Episode 1 photo shoot: Avant-garde couture in a garden (casting)
Episode 2 photo shoot: Bohemian maternity editorial
Episode 3 video shoot: Trademark style in a mirrored room
Episode 4 photo shoot: American Horror Story in a haunted mansion
Episode 5 photo shoot: Stacked beauty shots in groups
Episode 6 photo shoot: Princesses with former RuPaul's Drag Race contestants
Episode 7 photo shoot: Unretouched natural beauty in lingerie
Episode 8 photo shoot: Dripping in gold with plus-size male models
Episode 9 photo shoot: Parachute couture in the desert
Episode 10 photo shoot: Paper magazine covers 
Episode 12 music video: Mansion madness with Maejor 
Episode 13 photo shoot: Posing in pairs with Eva Marcille covered in tarantulas shot by Nigel Barker 
Episode 14 photo shoot: Pantene  campaigns 
Episode 15 photo shoot: Paper magazine 60s-inspired classic looks

Makeovers
Ivana – Cut short
Liz – Long bubblegum pink extensions with bangs 
Rhiyan – Super-long extensions
Coura – No makeover
Liberty – Dyed coppery red 
Christina – Kylie Jenner inspired shoulder length lime green weave 
Sandra – Kim Kardashian inspired shoulder length bob 
Brendi K – Buzz cut and dyed black 
Erin – Long and wavy black weave
Rio – Cut short and dyed platinum blonde with split eyebrow
Shanice – Originally, Serena Williams inspired curly weave; later, no makeover due to skin issues.  
Khrystyana – Dyed platinum blonde
Jeana – Wig removed 
Kyla – Straightened and dyed dark brown

Critical reception
The season received mixed reviews from critics, with several praising the return of Banks to her hosting position while describing the season overall as paling in comparison to earlier seasons. Bowen Yang and Matt Rogers, writing for Vulture, ranked the finale one star out of a possible five and remarked, "We had admittedly hopped off this show’s bandwagon years ago, only to be lured back in with the promise that Tyra’s return would set its course anew." Yang and Rogers concluded, "This is not a good reality show. Its characterizations of the contestants jumped all over the place as it went, it lost more than one contestant who felt emotionally unsafe, its judges (save Ashley Graham) were cartoonishly self-aggrandizing, and you could strongly argue that the best contestant, on paper and in our hearts, lost for no good reason at all." Joey Guerra of HoustonChronicle.com compared the season finale to a "limp balloon," while Scaachi Koul of Buzzfeed News noted, "ANTM lives and dies by Tyra Banks’s energy," but remarked that "there’s clear callousness in the show’s attempt to become political."

Notes

References

External links

America's Next Top Model
2018 American television seasons
Television shows filmed in California